Adam Amandi (1926–2006) was an Educationist, Farmer, Environmentalist and Ghanaian politician. He was a three-time Member of Parliament (1954, 1957, 1969), and a senior member of the Busia Administration. He was a true blue, blue blooded founding member of the Northern People's Party and the New Patriotic Party.

Early life and education 
Adam Amandi was born about 1926, into the Royal Family of Bawku, Mamprugu.  A town in the Upper Region of Ghana.  Adam was the grand son of the 8th Bawku Naa Kugri, Mahamma II Mamboda (Zangina), during whose reign the Union Jack—a symbol of British Authority Overseas—was first hoisted in front of his Palace, between 1907 and 1909.

Adam, a great man of renown was an avid reader. A history buff with an in-depth knowledge of the account of the Moré-Dagbani ethnic set. He attended Government Teacher's Training College, Pusiga, now called Gbewaa College of Education  where he obtained a Teachers' Training Certificate Degree in teaching. He further went to Government Teacher Training College Tamale(now called Tamale College of Education) where he obtained Diploma in English.

Politics 
Adam was a member of the ruling Progress Party when he became member of the Parliament in October 1969. During the same time, he was also appointed minister of state between 1969 and 1972.  He had earlier served in the Parliament in 1954 and 1957.

Personal life 
Adam was a Muslim. He was married with one wife, fourteen children and twenty three grandchildren

Death 
He died on 21 February 2006 after a short illness at the age of 92.

See also 

 List of MPs elected in the 1969 Ghanaian Parliamentary Elections.

References

2006 deaths
Ghanaian MPs 1956–1965
Ghanaian MPs 1969–1972
Northern People's Party politicians
1926 births
Ghanaian Muslims